The Nottinghamshire Guardian was a newspaper in Nottinghamshire, England: it was published from 1849 to 1900.

References

Newspapers published in Nottinghamshire
Publications established in 1849
Publications disestablished in 1900
1849 establishments in England
1900 disestablishments in England